The Left Liberation Front is a far-left electoral coalition in Sri Lanka.  It was founded in 1998 as the New Left Front by the Nava Sama Samaja Party, former members of the People's Alliance, and the Janatha Vimukthi Peramuna.

The alliance has changed its name twice from the New Left Front: firstly to Left Front and secondly to Left Liberation Front in early 2010.

Members
Its current members are:

 Democratic Left Front
 National Democratic Movement
 Nava Sama Samaja Party
 New Democratic Party

Elections
In the 2005 Sri Lankan presidential election, the New Left Front's candidate Chamil Jayaneththi came sixth of thirteen, with 9,296 votes.

See also

1998 establishments in Sri Lanka
Communist parties in Sri Lanka
Defunct left-wing political party alliances
Defunct political party alliances in Sri Lanka
Political parties established in 1998
Trotskyist organisations in Sri Lanka
Sri Lanka